José Dimas Cedeño Delgado (born 23 July 1933) was the Roman Catholic archbishop of the Archdiocese of Panamá from 1994 to 2010, when his resignation was accepted by Pope Benedict XVI for reasons of age. Benedict appointed one of the Archbishop's Auxiliary Bishops, Bishop Jose Domingo Ulloa Mendieta, O.S.A., to serve as the next Metropolitan Archbishop of Panama.

Cedeño was ordained a priest in 1961 and was consecrated a bishop in 1975 when he became the bishop of the Diocese of Santiago de Veraguas. Cedeño succeeded Marcos Gregorio McGrath as the archbishop of Panama on 18 April 1994.

External links
 Metropolitan Archdiocese of Panamá
 http://www.catholic-hierarchy.org/bishop/bcedeno.html Catholic-Hierarchy.org Profile

1933 births
20th-century Roman Catholic archbishops in Panama
21st-century Roman Catholic archbishops in Panama
Living people
Roman Catholic bishops of Santiago de Veraguas
Roman Catholic archbishops of Panamá
Panamanian Roman Catholic archbishops